Defending champions Stefan Edberg and Anders Järryd successfully defended their title, defeating Guy Forget and Yannick Noah in the final, 6–3, 7–6, 6–3 to win the doubles tennis title at the 1986 Masters Grand Prix.

Draw

Finals

Red group
Standings are determined by: 1. number of wins; 2. number of matches; 3. in two-players-ties, head-to-head records; 4. in three-players-ties, percentage of sets won, or of games won; 5. steering-committee decision.

Blue group
Standings are determined by: 1. number of wins; 2. number of matches; 3. in two-players-ties, head-to-head records; 4. in three-players-ties, percentage of sets won, or of games won; 5. steering-committee decision.

References

External links
 Stefan Edberg Doubles-1986 from ATP
 Guy Forget Doubles-1986 from ATP
 Sergio Casal Doubles-1986 from ATP
 Joakim Nystrom Doubles-1986 from ATP
 Andrés Gómez Doubles-1986 from ATP
John Fitzgerald Doubles-1986 from ATP

Doubles